Ottawa Transportation Commission was the public transit operator for the city of Ottawa from 1948 until the creation of OC Transpo in 1973.

OTC took over streetcar operations from the Ottawa Electric Railway, but they were gradually abandoned for trolley bus and bus operations. Some streetcars were sold to the Toronto Transit Commission.

Routes

List of routes as of 1948:

Streetcar Routes

 Line A - Britannia
 Line H - Hull-St Patrick
 Line S - Sommerset and Laurier
 Line R - Preston-Rockcliffe
 Line B - Bank-Rideau
 Line E - Bronson

Bus Routes 
 Elgin
 Crosstown
 Templeton
 Crerar

Fleet

Electric Trolley Bus Roster

Trolley Bus operation began December 15, 1951, and ran until June 27, 1959

Streetcar Roster

Streetcar operation continued from the Ottawa Electric Railway and ran until May 1, 1959

Demo Buses

References
 OC Transpo: Ottawa Public Transit Milestones
 Ottawa Electric Railway & Ottawa Transportation Commission
 Tom's North American Trolleybus Pix - Ottawa

Transport in Ottawa
Bus transport in Ottawa